, or , was a province of Japan in the part of Honshū that is today Wakayama Prefecture, as well as the southern part of Mie Prefecture. Kii bordered Ise, Izumi, Kawachi, Shima, and Yamato Provinces. The Kii Peninsula takes its name from this province.

During the Edo period, the Kii branch of the Tokugawa clan had its castle at Wakayama. Its former ichinomiya shrine was Hinokuma Shrine.

The Japanese bookshop chain Kinokuniya derives its name from the province.

Historical districts
 Wakayama Prefecture
 Ama District (海部郡) - merged with Nagusa District to become Kaisō District (海草郡) on April 1, 1896
 Arida District (有田郡)
 Hidaka District (日高郡)
 Ito District (伊都郡)
 Naga District (那賀郡) - dissolved
 Nagusa District (名草郡) - merged with Ama District to become Kaisō District on April 1, 1896
 Mixed
 Muro District (牟婁郡)
 Higashimuro District (東牟婁郡) - part of Wakayama Prefecture
 Kitamuro District (北牟婁郡) - part of Mie Prefecture
 Minamimuro District (南牟婁郡) - part of Mie Prefecture
 Nishimuro District (西牟婁郡) - part of Wakayama Prefecture

Notes

References
 Nussbaum, Louis-Frédéric and Käthe Roth. (2005).  Japan encyclopedia. Cambridge: Harvard University Press. ;  OCLC 58053128

External links 

  Murdoch's map of provinces, 1903

Former provinces of Japan
History of Mie Prefecture
History of Wakayama Prefecture